Papilio lowi, the great yellow Mormon or Asian swallowtail, is a butterfly of the family Papilionidae. The species was first described by Herbert Druce in 1873. It is found in Borneo, Indonesia, and the Philippines (Palawan, Balabac).

Wingspan: 

Larvae feed on citrus plants. Adults nectar on various flowers.

Adults of P. lowi, much like other Mormons, mimic the inedible red-bodied swallowtails.

It is named after British colonial administrator and naturalist Hugh Low.

References

External links

Papilio lowi, EoL

lowii
Butterflies of Borneo
Butterflies described in 1873